Skee is a locality situated in Strömstad Municipality, Västra Götaland County, Sweden, with 583 inhabitants in 2010.

See also 

 Blomsholm

References 

Populated places in Västra Götaland County
Populated places in Strömstad Municipality